This is a list of airports in Guatemala, sorted by location.

Guatemala, officially the Republic of Guatemala, is a country in Central America bordered by Mexico to the north and west, the Pacific Ocean to the southwest, Belize to the northeast, the Caribbean to the east, and Honduras and El Salvador to the southeast. Its capital in Guatemala City.



Airports 

Names shown in bold indicate the airport has scheduled passenger service on commercial airlines.

Unauthorized airstrips
There are numerous unauthorized airstrips used to facilitate drug trafficking in the region, with as many as 66 such airstrips in the vicinity of the Maya Biosphere Reserve alone.

See also 
 Guatemalan Air Force
 Transportation in Guatemala
 List of airports by ICAO code: M#MG - Guatemala
 List of aviation accidents and incidents in Guatemala
 Wikipedia: WikiProject Aviation/Airline destination lists: North America#Guatemala

References 
 
  - includes IATA codes
 Guatemala Military Air Bases
 Great Circle Mapper: Airports in Guatemala - IATA and ICAO codes
 World Aero Data: Airports in Guatemala - ICAO codes and airport data

 
Guatemala
Airports
Airports
Guatemala